Phyllocnistis tectonivora is a moth of the family Gracillariidae, known from Java, Indonesia. The hostplant for the species is Tectona grandis.

References

Phyllocnistis
Endemic fauna of Indonesia